Patricia Nolin (born March 17, 1940 in Montreal, Quebec) is a Canadian actress from Quebec. She is most noted for her performance in the film Beyond Forty (La Quarantaine), for which she was a Genie Award nominee for Best Supporting Actress at the 4th Genie Awards in 1983.

She has also appeared in the films La terre à boire, The Dame in Colour (La Dame en couleurs), Laura Laur, Cargo, Maman Last Call, Familia and And the Birds Rained Down (Il pleuvait des oiseaux).

Filmography

Film

Television

References

External links

1940 births
Living people
20th-century Canadian actresses
21st-century Canadian actresses
Canadian film actresses
Canadian stage actresses
Canadian television actresses
Actresses from Montreal
French Quebecers